Soncoya is a common name for several trees with edible fruit and may refer to:

Annona diversifolia
Annona purpurea